Shrimps is a fashion label founded by London-based designer, Hannah Weiland, launched in 2013. Originally launched with one faux fur coat and then centred around faux fur outerwear and accessories, Shrimps is now a full RTW label offering a variety of pieces as well as the faux fur outerwear that made its name. Shrimps became famous for its signature faux fur coats, garnering support from animal rights activists such as PETA, and drawing new attention to faux fur as a fabric in fashion.

Early supporters of the brand include Laura Bailey, Natalie Massenet, Adwoa Aboah, Alexa Chung, amongst others.

Shrimps presents new collections seasonally on schedule at London Fashion Week. Stockists for the brand include: Dover Street Market, Selfridges, Matchesfashion.com, Nordstrom, Bon Marché, BOONTHESHOP and MyTheresa.

Aesthetic and inspiration

With a background in History of Art and a diploma in Surface Textile Design from the London College of Fashion, Weiland takes her inspiration from the witticisms of modern art and a playful engagement with pattern and texture. 
Using carefully sourced fabrics that emphasise colour and texture, Weiland creates unique, beautifully crafted pieces. At the heart of the brand is faux fur and outerwear, however the collections are now full RTW collections including accessories

References

External links 
 

Clothing brands of the United Kingdom